Ion David (born 1900, date of death unknown) was a Romanian athlete. He competed in the men's shot put and the men's discus throw at the 1928 Summer Olympics.

References

External links
 

1900 births
Year of death missing
Athletes (track and field) at the 1928 Summer Olympics
Romanian male shot putters
Romanian male discus throwers
Olympic athletes of Romania
Place of birth missing